Ernest Peterly (1 January 1892 – December 1955) was a Swiss footballer who played as a midfielder. He spent his whole career playing with SC Brühl in Switzerland and Internazionale in Italy, with whom he won the 1909–10 Italian Football Championship, being the top goal scorer. He also won the 1914–15 Swiss Serie A with SC Brühl, helping the club to win its first ever trophy.

Peterly was also a former Swiss international footballer, representing his country five times between 1913 and 1918.

Honours

Internazionale
Italian Football Championship: 1909–10

SC Brühl
Swiss Serie A: 1914–15

Individual
Capocannoniere: 1909–10

References

External links

 
 Official profile at inter.it

1892 births
1955 deaths
Swiss men's footballers
Switzerland international footballers
SC Brühl players
Inter Milan players
Serie A players
Swiss expatriate footballers
Expatriate footballers in Italy
Association football midfielders